Sir Hugh John Ellis-Nanney, 1st Baronet,  (16 February 18457 June 1920) was a Welsh landowner, magistrate and British politician.

During his lifetime, Ellis-Nanney gained wealth and stature residing in north Wales, UK. He was made Baronet of Gwynfryn and Cefndeuddwr in the year 1898. Ellis-Nanney was a landowner and had accumulated land and wealth through inheritance. The baronet invested in property which enabled him to build a new mansion called Gwynfryn, near Llanystumdwy. Ellis-Nanney was made a sheriff and had also become a justice of the peace in Caernarvonshire. Prior to becoming a baronet he stood in local elections.

Public life
He was a Justice of the Peace for Carnarvonshire and Merionethshire and a Deputy Lieutenant of Carnarvonshire. He also served as High Sheriff of Caernarvonshire in 1870, and as the High Sheriff of Merionethshire in 1877.

Politics
He stood unsuccessfully for the UK parliamentary constituency of Eifion in 1885 and for Caernarvon Boroughs in 1890 and 1895. He was defeated in all three local elections, twice by the future Prime Minister of the United Kingdom, David Lloyd George, losing by only 18 votes out of a total of almost 4,000 in the 1890 by-election.

Baronetcy
In 1897 Hugh Ellis-Nanney was conferred the title of Baronet of Gwynfryn and Cefndeuddwr by Queen Victoria during the monarch's Diamond Jubliee celebrations in London. Upon the Lord and Lady's return to Criccieth a meeting was held to commemorate the occasion with the most prominent people in the area. 

The title represented his families of Gwynfryn in the Parish of Criccieth of the County of Caernarvonshire, and also of Cefndeuddwr in the Parish of Trawsfynydd of the County of Merioneth. The two towns of Criccieth and Trawsfynydd lie in what is now Dwyfor Meirionnydd (UK Parliament constituency),  but historically has been a part of the Kingdom of Gwynedd.

Ancestors
The Nanney  family of 'Gwynfryn and Cefndeuddwr' are an ancient family from near Criccieth in Caernarvonshire. The family of Gwynfryn, Llanystumdwy, are descendants of 'Collwyn ap Tango' the 10th century Lord of Eifionydd, progenitor of the fifth of Fifteen Tribes of Wales. The Nanneys of Cefndeuddwr are descended from the Nannau family, including Hywel Sele (9th Lord of Nannau), who was a cousin of Owain Glyndŵr. Sele was a descendant of Welsh royalty through Prince Cadwgan ap Bleddyn and his son Madog ap Cadwgan, the 1st Lord of Nannau. The family are also descended from the Irish Norman knight Roger de Montgomery who fought at the Battle of Hastings in 1066, and from Osbwrn Wyddel of the Irish Kingdom of Desmond. 

The first mention of 'Gwynfryn' is of 'Gruffydd ap John ap Grono' living at Gwynfryn in the 16th century. The Wynn family took ownership of the lands until Owen Wynn died in 1688. The estate of Gwynfryn was then acquired by an ancestor, Richard Ellis of Bodychen, Llandrygan, Anglesey. From the 18th century the estate descended through the 'Ellis' family for centuries.

The Nanney family branch were religious Puritans. They were related through marriage to the Lloyds of Rhiwgoch who resided at the 'Brynmaenllwyd' estate in Trawsfynydd. The Nanneys were seen to have a high status and occupied the local area since the Elizabethan era.

The aforementioned baronet, Hugh John Ellis-Nanney was the only son of Owen Jones of Bryn Hir, Criccieth. The Ellis-Nanney family had inherited the lands of Bachwen and Elernion in Llanaelhaearn (which were owned by the Nanney of Cefndeuddwr family) from Jones' uncle David Ellis Nanney, who had gained ownership in 1812. Jones had bequeathed the estate on the same terms as his uncle had done, namely on the condition that he assumed the double-barrelled surname of 'Ellis-Nanney'. His ancestors included successive vicars of Clynnog, beginning with Richard Nanney (died 1767), and then his son in law, Ellis of Bodychen who married Catherine Nanney. Ellis-Nanney's father had married 23 year old Mary Jones (18201849) in 1843. She was the eldest daughter and heiress of Hugh Jones of Hengwrtucha, Llanfachreth in Merionethshire, who was a business partner of the Diphwys Casson quarry. Through his inheritance Ellis-Nanney acquired property and land in his name. After the death of his father, Ellis-Nanney bought the surrounding land of Criccieth, including land from William Ormsby-Gore and from Sir Thomas Mostyn. He had by then amassed the whole of the western part of the local district except one farm, before proceeding to demolish his family hall near Llanystumdwy to make way for his new home. The Nanneys of Gwynfryn and Cefndeuddwr amassed a small fortune from leasing lands to tenant farms in Gwynedd.

Descent of the Gwynfryn of Cefndeuddwr Family
In 1552 Richard Nanney (son of the 12th Lord of Nannau and his second wife Lowri who was from Trawsfynydd) was an esquire to Henry VIII. He married Elizabeth, the daughter of Baron Lewis Owen, Vice Chamberlain of North Wales, of Cwrt Plas Dolgellau. This marriage marks the beginning of the cadet branch of the Nanneys of Cefndeuddwr, followed by Lewis, Richard, Lewis, over subsequent generations; then the Ellis-Nanney family of Gwynfryn and Cefndeuddwr :

Richard Nanney of Cefndeuddwr 
Robert Nanney (died 1718).
Richard Nanney (16911767).
Catherine Nanney (8 November 173624 August 1803) Married (1 August 1757) Richard Ellis of Gwynfryn (17301 December 1805).
David Ellis Nanney (17595 June 1819).
Elizabeth (buried 21 March 1801)
Major Owen Jones Ellis-Nanney (17901870).
Sir Hugh John Ellis-Nanney.

Plas Gwynfryn

'Plas Gwynfryn' the mansion is positioned beautifully on the Llŷn Peninsula overlooking Wales' highest mountain range, Snowdonia and also westerly to Cardigan Bay. The land was a 12,072 acre estate in the year 1873, and the annual rental income was £5,814. Designed by 'George Williams' and constructed over 10 years between 1866-1876, it cost of £70,000. The mansion was featured in the June edition of “The Builder” in 1877. It was used as a home for only 52 years until 1928 with the death of Lady Ellis-Nanney.

The Church in Wales then used Plas Gwynfryn as a retirement home for clergy until World War II, when the home became a hospital. It was later was turned into an orphanage. The estate was sold in 1959 and became a hotel. The mansion was later devastated by a fire in 1982. Gwynfryn has since been abandoned and occupied by squatters. The former Grade II castellated mansion was put up for sale in 2019 with an asking price of £500,000. However it would take £1.5m to restore. Although a ruin it still has original features such as  its porte-cochere, and stone mullioned and transom windows. Since February 2021, a professional member of Royal Institution of Chartered Surveyors working in coordination with the Welsh Government, Cadw and Coflein made a proposition for a renovation and conversion to turn Plas Gwynfryn into apartments, similar to Blencowe Hall in Cumbria, which also features a collapsed tower, now with an inserted glazed structure.
 
The name 'Plas Gwynfryn' was taken from the Welsh language, an ancient Celtic language of the Welsh people. 'Gwynfryn' is also a Welsh boy's name which translates as 'White Hill', whilst 'Plas' translates as 'Mansion'.

Criccieth - the Promenade
The east side of the town was developed by the Ellis-Nanney family during the Victorian era. With private funding a promenade was constructed in 1888, with plans for 25 homes on the surrounding land. The promenade / esplanade was built with 4 homes designed and constructed by George Leedham Fuller. However, during the first winter the sea wall didn't protect the land, the homes were flooded and no more homes were constructed. The homes were demolished in 1925. The land was eventually donated to the community by Hugh's daughter Mrs. Lewis. The promenade remains a popular destination for walks to this day.

Personal life
Hugh Ellis-Nanney married Elizabeth Octavia Dillon, the daughter of Robert Dillon, 3rd Baron Clonbrock (from the House of 'Dillon' from Galway, Connacht), on 13 January 1875. They had two children, daughter Mary Elizabeth (born 1877) and son Owen Gerald (born 1879, died 1887 in Bournemouth). He was a member of the Carlton Club in London.

Ellis-Nanney died on 7 June 1920. He was buried in St. John the Baptist Churchyard. Upon his death, the baronetcy became extinct.

Lady Ellis-Nanney died in January 1928. The properties of Gwynfryn, Plas Hen, and Brynhir were left to their daughter, who in 1913 married the Reverend John Prince Lewis, M.A., rector of Llanystumdwy. She lived in Plas Hen, now called Plas Talhenbont. She died a widow and childless on 12 February 1947.

References

Notes

Books cited

1845 births
1920 deaths
Baronets in the Baronetage of the United Kingdom
Conservative Party (UK) parliamentary candidates
Deputy Lieutenants of Caernarvonshire
High Sheriffs of Caernarvonshire
High Sheriffs of Merionethshire
Welsh justices of the peace